William Rose (August 31, 1918 – February 10, 1987) was an American screenwriter of British and Hollywood films.

Life and career

Born in Jefferson City, Missouri,  Rose traveled to Canada after the 1939 outbreak of World War II and volunteered to fight with the Black Watch. After being stationed at bases in Scotland and Europe, he returned to live in Britain at war's end to work as a screenwriter, marrying an English woman, Tania Price, with whom he would later collaborate.

Blessed with the ability to adapt to two distinct cultures, William Rose wrote a number of successful British comedies including Genevieve (1953).  He became a working associate of the American-born director Alexander Mackendrick notably for his collaboration on The Maggie (US:High and Dry, 1954) and The Ladykillers (1955). He also provided scripts for Hollywood studios, earning several Academy Award nominations for his screenwriting and winning the Academy Award for Writing Original Screenplay for Guess Who's Coming to Dinner (1967). Rose also  won the Writers Guild of America award for Best Written American Comedy for The Russians Are Coming, the Russians Are Coming (1966).

In 1973, Rose's lifetime achievements were recognized by the Writers Guild of America with their Laurel Award for Screenwriting Achievement. In the 1970s, he had a brief relationship with Katharine Hepburn.

William Rose died in 1987 in Jersey, Channel Islands.  He is buried in the Churchyard at St. Clement Parish Church, Jersey. William and Tania divorced; she died in 2015 aged 95.

Screenwriting awards

Filmography

Notes

External links
 

1914 births
1987 deaths
Best British Screenplay BAFTA Award winners
American expatriates in the United Kingdom
American male screenwriters
British Army personnel of World War II
People from Jefferson City, Missouri
Best Original Screenplay Academy Award winners
Jersey screenwriters
Screenwriters from Missouri
20th-century American male writers
20th-century American screenwriters
20th-century British screenwriters
Black Watch soldiers